The 2019 Challenge Cup Final was the culmination of the 2018–19 Challenge Cup. The final was contested between Belfast Giants and Guildford Flames. The Giants were the cup holders and the Flames were in their first ever final at Elite League level.

After a scoreless first period it was the Giants who took the lead when Patrick Dwyer scored a powerplay goal assisted by Josh Roach & Kyle Baun at 20:33. The Flames equalised through Jamie Crooks with a bullet on the powerplay at 36:38. The third period was scoreless which sent the game into overtime with the score level at 1–1. Belfast won the game and retained the Challenge Cup when Jordan Smotherman scored with 69:30 on the clock.

Path to the Finals

Belfast Giants

Guildford Flames

References

Ice hockey competitions in the United Kingdom
Challenge Cup Final
2019 in ice hockey
Challenge Cup